Kimiko Date-Krumm was the defending champion, but chose to compete at the 2013 Apia International Sydney instead.

Varatchaya Wongteanchai won the tournament, defeating Nadiya Kichenok in the final, 6–2, 6–7(5–7), 7–6(7–5).

Seeds

Main draw

Finals

Top half

Bottom half

References 
 Main draw

Blossom Cup - Singles
Industrial Bank Cup